Dylan Beaulieu (born 5 May 1997) is a French footballer who plays as a midfielder for US Lusitanos Saint-Maur.

Club career

Monaco
Beaulieu made his professional debut on 26 April 2017 in the Coupe de France semi-final against Paris Saint-Germain. He started the game  and played the whole match in a 5–0 away loss.

Lusitanos
In June 2019, Beaulieu joined US Lusitanos Saint-Maur.

Career statistics

Club

References

External links
Monaco profile

1997 births
Living people
People from Meudon
Association football midfielders
French footballers
French expatriate footballers
AS Monaco FC players
US Granville players
US Lusitanos Saint-Maur players
Championnat National 2 players
Expatriate footballers in Monaco
Footballers from Hauts-de-Seine